Tsakaling Gewog (Dzongkha: ཙ་ཀ་གླིང་) is a gewog (village block) of Mongar District, Bhutan.

References

Gewogs of Bhutan
Mongar District